Burner may refer to:

 Gas burner, coal burner or oil burner, a mechanical device that burns a gas or liquid fuel in a controlled manner
 Laboratory gas burners:
 Bunsen burner
 Meker–Fisher burner
 Teclu burner
 Hot-air balloon device, a device to inflate a hot air balloon
 Burner (rocket stage)
 Burner (Burning Man), an active participant in the annual Burning Man festival and the surrounding community
 Burner (Breadwinner album), 1994
 Burner (Odd Nosdam album), 2005
 Burner (comics), a fictional mutant character in the Marvel Comics Universe
 Burner or stinger (medicine), a minor neurological injury suffered mostly by athletes participating in contact sports
 Burner, a CD/DVD/Blu-ray recording tool; see Optical disc drive
 Prepaid mobile phone used temporarily so that the user cannot be traced
 Burner (mobile application) for cell phone privacy
 Raleigh Burner, a 500 bc BMX bike manufactured by Rudolph  Company
 Slang for a linear amplifier for CB radios
 A heating element on a kitchen stove
 Tina Burner, American drag queen

See also
 Burn (disambiguation)